Pseudotrichia  may refer to:
 Pseudotrichia (gastropod), a genus of air-breathing land snails in the family Hygromiidae
 Pseudotrichia (fungus), a genus of fungi in the family Melanommataceae